Summer Horns is a collaboration album by Dave Koz, Gerald Albright, Mindi Abair and Richard Elliot. It was released on May 7, 2013 via Concord Records. The album was nominated for Grammy Award for Best Pop Instrumental Album at the 56th Annual Grammy Awards (held on January 26, 2014) losing to Steppin' Out by Herb Alpert.

Track listing
 "Always There" (William Jeffrey, Ronnie Laws) - 4:05
 "Got to Get You into My Life" - 5:38
 "Rise" (Andy Armer, Randy Badazz) - 5:08
 "So Very Hard to Go" - 4:38
 "Hot Fun in the Summertime" - 4:27
 "Take Five" - 4:12
 "25 or 6 to 4" - 4:47
 "Reasons" (Philip Bailey, Maurice White, Charles Stepney) - 4:46
 "I Got You (I Feel Good)" - 4:17
 "You Haven't Done Nothin' - 3:46
 "God Bless the Child" - 5:58
 "Summer Horns" (Rick Braun, Paul Brown, Brian Culbertson, Dave Koz) - 3:57

Personnel 
Summer Horns
 Dave Koz – alto saxophone (1, 3, 4, 5, 8, 11), tenor saxophone (2, 7-10), soprano saxophone (3, 6, 12), baritone saxophone (4, 7), flute (8)
 Mindi Abair – alto saxophone
 Gerald Albright – tenor saxophone (1, 3-6, 11, 12), alto saxophone (2, 7-10), horn arrangements (9, 10)
 Richard Elliot – tenor saxophone

Musicians
 Tracy Carter – Wurlitzer organ (2, 4), Hammond B3 organ (2, 4, 7, 11), acoustic piano (4, 7), keyboards (7)
 Jeff Caruthers – keyboards (3, 8), guitars (3, 8), drum programming (3, 8)
 Marco Basci – keyboards (5, 12), drum programming (5), organ (9)
 David "Kahlid" Woods – keyboards (9), guitars (9), synth bass (9), drum programming (9)
 Darren Rahn – keyboards (10), synthesizers (10), Hammond B3 organ (10), drum programming (10)
 Paul Brown – guitars (1, 2, 4, 5, 10), electric guitars (7), steel guitar (7)
 Jay Gore – guitars (2, 4)
 Frank Selman – guitars (10)
 Jon Woodhead – guitars (11)
 Randy Jacobs – guitars (12)
 Roberto Valley – bass (2-5, 7, 8, 11, 12), acoustic bass (6)
 Mel Brown – bass (10)
 Ricky Lawson – drums (1, 2, 4, 5, 7, 9, 11, 12)
 Lenny Castro – percussion (4, 5, 7, 8, 10, 12)
 Lee Thornburg – trombone (1, 4), flugelhorn (1), trumpet (4)
 Nick Lane – trombone (2)
 Brian Culbertson – trombone (5, 10)
 Greg Adams – flugelhorn (1)
 Sean Billings – trumpet (2)
 Rick Braun – trumpet (10), flugelhorn (10)
 Michael McDonald – vocals (4)
 Jeffrey Osborne – vocals (5, 11)
 Jonathan Butler – vocals (5, 10)
 Billy Mondragon – backing vocals (5)
 Eric Mondragon – backing vocals (5)
 Damon Real – backing vocals (5)

Arrangements
 Marco Basci – rhythm arrangements (1, 5, 12), horn arrangements (12)
 Greg Adams – horn arrangements (1, 4, 5, 8, 12)
 Tracy Carter – rhythm arrangements (2, 4, 7, 11)
 Tom Scott – horn arrangements (2, 3, 7, 11)
 Jeff Caruthers – rhythm arrangements (3, 8)
 Gordon Goodwin – arrangerments (6)
 David "Kahlid" Woods – rhythm arrangements (9)
 Michael Stever – music copyist (9, 10)
 Darren Rahn – arrangements (10)
 Paul Brown – rhythm arrangements (12)

Production 
 John Burk – executive producer 
 Dave Koz – executive producer 
 Paul Brown – producer, recording, mixing 
 Darren Rahn – co-producer (10), recording 
 Jeff Caruthers – recording 
 Carmen Grillo – recording 
 John Lee – recording 
 Grady Walker – recording 
 David "Kahlid" Woods – recording 
 Lee Herschberg – mastering 
 Mary Hogan – A&R administration 
 Larissa Collins – creative direction 
 Greg Allen – art direction, design, photography 
 W.F. Leopold Management, Inc. – management

Chart history

References

External links 

2013 albums
Dave Koz albums
Smooth jazz albums
Collaborative albums